Marinella (Greek: Μαρινέλλα) is the name of a self-titled album by popular Greek singer Marinella. It was released in 1969 by Margophone/Minos EMI in Greece and all songs were released on 45 rpm vinyl records in 1965–67.

Track listing 

Side One.
 "Apopse hano mia psychi" (Απόψε χάνω μια ψυχή; Tonight I'm losing a soul) – (Giorgos Katsaros – Pythagoras) – 3:07
 This song had been released as a single in 1966.
 "Floges akoumpisan ton ourano" (Φλόγες ακούμπησαν τον ουρανό; Flames touched the sky) – (Aggelos Sempos – Lefteris Papadopoulos) – 2:20
 This song had been released as a single in 1966.
 "Kitaxe me mia stigmi" (Κοίταξέ με μια στιγμή; Look at me for a moment) – (Aggelos Sempos – Lefteris Papadopoulos) – 2:31
 This song had been released as a single in 1966.
 "Thalassa mou" (Θάλασσα μου; My sea) – (Mimis Plessas – Akos Daskalopoulos) – 2:16
 This song had been released as a single in 1966.
 "Apopse pou malosame" (Απόψε που μαλώσαμε; Tonight that we had a fight) – (Makis Tzortzatos – Pythagoras) – 2:49
 This song had been released as a single in 1967.
 "Eklapsa hthes" (Έκλαψα χθες; I cried yesterday) – (Mimis Plessas – Akos Daskalopoulos) – 2:41
 This song had been released as a single in 1966.
Side Two.
 "Ta pallikaria" (Τα παλικάρια; The lads) – (Yannis Markopoulos – Akos Daskalopoulos) – 2:18
 This song had been released as a single in 1965.
 "Sta matia sou gennithikan" (Στα μάτια σου γεννήθηκαν; In your eyes were born) – (Yannis Markopoulos – Akos Daskalopoulos) – 2:59
 This song had been released as a single in 1965.
 "Sti yeitonia" (Στη γειτονιά; In the neighborhood) – (Aggelos Sempos – Lefteris Papadopoulos) – 2:48
 This song had been released as a single in 1965.
 "Ase me na s' agapiso" (Άσε με να σ' αγαπήσω; Let me love you) – (Aggelos Sempos – Lefteris Papadopoulos) – 2:49
 This song had been released as a single in 1966.
 "Ola ta gkremises" (Όλα τα γκρέμισες; You tear them all down) – (Makis Tzortzatos) – 3:12
 This song had been released as a single in 1967.
 "Klise ta matia sou, kardia mou" (Κλείσε τα μάτια σου, καρδιά μου; Close your eyes, my heart) – (Giorgos Katsaros – Pythagoras) – 2:58
 This song had been released as a single in 1966.

Personnel 
 Marinella – vocals
 Marios Kostoglou – background vocals on tracks 1 and 2
 Giorgos Katsaros – arranger and conductor on tracks 1 and 12 
 Mimis Plessas – arranger and conductor on tracks 4 and 6
 Yannis Markopoulos – arranger and conductor on tracks 7 and 8
 Aggelos Sempos – arranger and conductor on tracks 2, 3, 9 and 10
 Makis Tzortzatos – arranger and conductor on tracks 5 and 11
 Romilos Parisis – photographer
 Minos EMI – producer

References

1969 albums
Marinella albums
Greek-language albums
Minos EMI albums